The list of ship launches in 1941 includes a chronological list of ships launched in 1941.  In cases where no official launching ceremony was held, the date built or completed may be used instead.


References

Sources

1941
Ship launches